This is the results breakdown of the local elections held in Castilla–La Mancha on 8 May 1983. The following tables show detailed results in the autonomous community's most populous municipalities, sorted alphabetically.

Overall

City control
The following table lists party control in the most populous municipalities, including provincial capitals (shown in bold). Gains for a party are displayed with the cell's background shaded in that party's colour.

Municipalities

Albacete
Population: 116,484

Ciudad Real
Population: 50,151

Cuenca
Population: 40,007

Guadalajara
Population: 55,137

Talavera de la Reina
Population: 64,840

Toledo
Population: 54,335

See also
1983 Castilian-Manchegan regional election

References

Castilla-La Mancha
1983